Englewood Cliffs is a borough in Bergen County, in the U.S. state of New Jersey. As of the 2020 United States census, the borough's population was 5,342, an increase of 61 (+1.2%) from the 2010 census count of 5,281, which in turn reflected a decline of 41 (-0.8%) from the 5,322 counted in the 2000 census.

The borough houses the world headquarters of CNBC (NBCUniversal), the North American headquarters of South Korean conglomerate LG Corp, and the American headquarters of global CPG conglomerate Unilever, and was home to both Ferrari and Maserati North America.

The borough was formed in 1895, having seceded from Englewood Township, with William Outis Allison serving as the new municipality's first mayor, as part of the "Boroughitis" then sweeping Bergen County, with 26 boroughs formed in the county in 1894 alone.

Geography

According to the United States Census Bureau, the borough had a total area of 3.37 square miles (8.73 km2), including 2.13 square miles (5.51 km2) of land and 1.24 square miles (3.22 km2) of water (36.91%).

The borough borders Englewood, Fort Lee and Tenafly in Bergen County, and the New York City boroughs of The Bronx and Manhattan across the Hudson River.

Demographics

In 2012, Englewood Cliffs was ranked 129th in the nation, and fifth in New Jersey, on the list of most expensive ZIP Codes in the United States by Forbes magazine, with a median home price of $1,439,115. In 2006, the borough was ranked sixth in New Jersey and 78th in the nation in the magazine's rankings, with a median house price of $1,112,500.

2010 census

Korean Americans accounted for 20.3% of the borough's population. Englewood Cliffs has witnessed expansion of this demographic from the adjoining Fort Lee Koreatown, as well as from the borough's status as the North American headquarters of the LG Corporation, based in Seoul. The Korean language is spoken at home by more than half of the residents of Englewood Cliffs, according to U.S. Census Bureau data released in 2017.

Same-sex couples headed 10 households in 2010, an increase from the three counted in 2000.

The Census Bureau's 2006–2010 American Community Survey showed that (in 2010 inflation-adjusted dollars) median household income was $101,964 (with a margin of error of +/− $32,516) and the median family income was $126,985 (+/− $37,177). Males had a median income of $88,438 (+/− $9,456) versus $52,950 (+/− $7,757) for females. The per capita income for the borough was $53,260 (+/− $12,101). About 8.0% of families and 16.1% of the population were below the poverty line, including 10.9% of those under age 18 and 32.7% of those age 65 or over.

2000 census
As of the 2000 United States census there were 5,322 people, 1,818 households, and 1,559 families residing in the borough. The population density was 2,544.3 people per square mile (983.2/km2). There were 1,889 housing units at an average density of 903.1 per square mile (349.0/km2). The racial makeup of the borough was 66.84% White, 1.37% African American, 0.04% Native American, 29.69% Asian, 0.71% from other races, and 1.35% from two or more races. Hispanic or Latino of any race were 4.89% of the population.

There were 1,818 households, out of which 31.4% had children under the age of 18 living with them, 76.0% were married couples living together, 7.0% had a female householder with no husband present, and 14.2% were non-families. 12.5% of all households were made up of individuals, and 8.3% had someone living alone who was 65 years of age or older. The average household size was 2.90 and the average family size was 3.16.

In the borough the age distribution of the population shows 20.7% under the age of 18, 5.7% from 18 to 24, 23.9% from 25 to 44, 27.7% from 45 to 64, and 22.0% who were 65 years of age or older. The median age was 45 years. For every 100 females, there were 89.1 males. For every 100 females age 18 and over, there were 84.8 males.

The median income for a household in the borough was $106,478, and the median income for a family was $113,187 in 2000. In 2008, the estimated median income had risen to $134,419. Males had a median income of $79,501 versus $42,019 for females. The per capita income for the borough was $57,399. About 1.4% of families and 2.6% of the population were below the poverty line, including 1.9% of those under age 18 and 5.3% of those age 65 or over.

As of the 2000 Census, 11.76% of Englewood Cliffs' residents identified themselves as being of Korean ancestry, which was the tenth highest in the United States and eighth highest of any municipality in New Jersey, for all places with 1,000 or more residents identifying their ancestry. The 2000 census found that 3.4% of Englewood Cliffs residents identified themselves as being of Armenian-American ancestry, the eighth highest percentage of Armenian American people in any place in the United States. In the 2000 census, 8.42% of Englewood Cliffs' residents identified themselves as being of Chinese ancestry. This was the third highest percentage of people with Chinese ancestry in any place in New Jersey with 1,000 or more residents identifying their ancestry. In this same census, 2.91% of Englewood Cliffs' residents identified themselves as being of Japanese ancestry, which was the fifth highest of any municipality in New Jersey—behind Fort Lee (6.09%), Demarest (3.72%), Edgewater (3.22%) and Leonia (3.07%)—for all places with 1,000 or more residents identifying their ancestry. As of the 2010 Census, 20.3% of the population (1,072) reported  as being of Korean ancestry, 8.9% (472) Chinese and 5.7% (300) Asian Indian.

Economy

CNBC, LG North American headquarters, and Unilever North America are headquartered in Englewood Cliffs.

LG Electronics held a groundbreaking ceremony on November 14, 2013, to build an environmentally friendly North American headquarters in Englewood Cliffs, having received a favorable legal decision subsequently being appealed based upon building height issues. Protesters have sharply criticized the proposal, arguing that the  height of the building exceeds the borough's  limit and that the height of the building above the tree line will disrupt views of the Palisades.

In 2017, Maserati announced it was moving its U.S. headquarters from Englewood Cliffs to the former Walter P. Chrysler Museum in Auburn Hills, Michigan.

Government

Local government
Englewood Cliffs is governed under the Borough form of New Jersey municipal government, which is used in 218 municipalities (of the 564) statewide, making it the most common form of government in New Jersey. The governing body is comprised of a Mayor and a Borough Council, with all positions elected at-large on a partisan basis as part of the November general election. A Mayor is elected directly by the voters to a four-year term of office. The Borough Council is comprised of six members elected to serve three-year terms on a staggered basis, with two seats coming up for election each year in a three-year cycle. The Borough form of government used by Englewood Cliffs is a "weak mayor / strong council" government in which council members act as the legislative body with the mayor presiding at meetings and voting only in the event of a tie. The mayor can veto ordinances subject to an override by a two-thirds majority vote of the council. The mayor makes committee and liaison assignments for council members, and most appointments are made by the mayor with the advice and consent of the council.

, the Mayor is Republican Mario M. Kranjac, whose term of office ends December 31, 2023. Elected to office in 2015, Kranjac became the borough's first Republican mayor in 40 years. Members of the Englewood Cliffs Borough Council are Council President Glen Luciano (D, 2024), David Di Gregorio (D, 2024), Kris Kim (D, 2025), Tim Koutroubas (R, 2023), Mark Park (R, 2023) and Melanie Simon (D, 2025).

Mayors

 Mario M. Kranjac    2016 to present
 Joseph Parisi Jr.     2008 to 2015.
 Joseph Parisi Sr.    1976 to 2005.
 Thomas E. Stagnitti   (1923–2006) – 1964 to 1976.
 William Outis Allison (1849–1924). He was the first Mayor of Englewood Cliffs, and served four terms in office, from 1895 to 1911 (?).

Federal, state, and county representation
Englewood Cliffs is located in the 5th Congressional District and is part of New Jersey's 37th state legislative district.

In redistricting following the 2010 census, which was in effect from 2013 to 2022, the borough was in the 9th congressional district.

Politics

Historically, Englewood Cliffs has generally supported Republican candidates for president, although the borough has been rather split in recent decades. Since 1992, no presidential candidate of any political party has carried the borough with over 60% of the vote.

In March 2011, there were a total of 3,505 registered voters in Englewood Cliffs, of which 1,069 (30.5% vs. 31.7% countywide) were registered as Democrats, 761 (21.7% vs. 21.1%) were registered as Republicans and 1,675 (47.8% vs. 47.1%) were registered as Unaffiliated. There were no voters registered to other parties. Among the borough's 2010 Census population, 66.4% (vs. 57.1% in Bergen County) were registered to vote, including 84.6% of those ages 18 and over (vs. 73.7% countywide).

In the 2013 gubernatorial election, Republican Chris Christie received 74.2% of the vote (1,182 cast), ahead of Democrat Barbara Buono with 24.9% (397 votes), and other candidates with 0.9% (14 votes), among the 1,669 ballots cast by the borough's 3,528 registered voters (76 ballots were spoiled), for a turnout of 47.3%. In the 2009 gubernatorial election, Republican Chris Christie received 1,059 votes (51.5% vs. 45.8% countywide), ahead of Democrat Jon Corzine with 879 votes (42.7% vs. 48.0%), Independent Chris Daggett with 54 votes (2.6% vs. 4.7%) and other candidates with 12 votes (0.6% vs. 0.5%), among the 2,057 ballots cast by the borough's 3,588 registered voters, yielding a 57.3% turnout (vs. 50.0% in the county).

Emergency services

Ambulance corps
Emergency medical services (EMS) are provided to the borough of Englewood Cliffs by Englewood Hospital and Medical Center under the terms of an agreement between the borough and the hospital.

The borough had been served by the Englewood Cliffs Volunteer Ambulance Corps, which was staffed by trained and certified Emergency Medical Technicians who were on call from 7:00 PM to 6:00 AM on weekdays and 24/7 on weekends. ECVAC maintained three vehicles, two Ford Type-III ambulances and a Chevy Tahoe SUV and responded to an average of over 300 medical emergencies each year. The ECVAC was disbanded in August 2012 by the Mayor and Council of Englewood Cliffs, citing delays in providing prompt emergency response to borough residents due to the lack of volunteers, and replaced by a contract with Englewood Hospital and Medical Center.

Education
The Englewood Cliffs Public Schools serves children in pre-kindergarten through eighth grade. As of the 2020–21 school year, the district, comprised of two schools, had an enrollment of 439 students and 48.3 classroom teachers (on an FTE basis), for a student–teacher ratio of 9.1:1. Schools in the district (with 2020–21 enrollment data from the National Center for Education Statistics) are 
North Cliff School with 139 students in grades PreK–2 and 
Upper School with 292 students in grades 3–8.

The school district has a sending/receiving relationship with the Englewood Public School District under which students attend public high school at Dwight Morrow High School in Englewood. As of the 2020–21 school year, the high school had an enrollment of 1,049 students and 84.8 classroom teachers (on an FTE basis), for a student–teacher ratio of 12.4:1.

Public school students from the borough, and all of Bergen County, are eligible to attend the secondary education programs offered by the Bergen County Technical Schools, which include the Bergen County Academies in Hackensack, and the Bergen Tech campus in Teterboro or Paramus. The district offers programs on a shared-time or full-time basis, with admission based on a selective application process and tuition covered by the student's home school district.

Since 1975, Englewood Cliffs has been home to a campus of Saint Peter's University, where evening and weekend classes are offered for Associate's degrees, Bachelor's degrees, and graduate degrees. The college's nursing program for registered nurses is also located at the campus. Previously, the campus had been home to Englewood Cliffs College, which closed in 1974.

Library
The borough does not have its own public library. After a 47-year-long relationship with the Englewood Public Library under which the borough paid $225,000 to allow borough residents to use the city's library, Englewood Cliffs started negotiations in 2016 with other municipalities to pay for privileges elsewhere.

Transportation

Roads and highways

U.S. Route 9W and the Palisades Interstate Parkway both run alongside each other for about  along the Hudson River from Fort Lee in the south to Tenafly in the north. County Route 505 (Hudson Terrace / Palisades Avenue) travels through the borough from Fort Lee in the south to Englewood in the east. Motorists can also take a scenic drive along Henry Hudson Drive at the Palisades Interstate Park, which is accessible via Dyckman Hill Road.

Public transportation
NJ Transit bus route 156 serves the Port Authority Bus Terminal in Midtown Manhattan and the 186 terminates at the George Washington Bridge Bus Terminal.

Rockland Coaches provides service along Route 9W to the Port Authority Bus Terminal on the 9T / 9AT routes and to the George Washington Bridge Bus Terminal on the 9 and 9A routes.

Notable people

People who were born in, residents of, or otherwise closely associated with Englewood Cliffs include:

 Robert A. Agresta (born 1983), investor, businessman, lawyer and inventor who has served on the Englewood Cliffs Borough Council
 Alan Aisenberg (born 1993), actor and television producer, best known for his role as Baxter Bayley on the Netflix original series Orange Is the New Black
 William Outis Allison (1849–1924) first Mayor of Englewood Cliffs
 Foxy Brown (born 1978), rapper
 Lee Conklin (born 1941), artist best known for his psychedelic poster art of the late 1960s and his iconic album cover for Santana's debut album
 Tobias Daniels (born 1982), filmmaker
 Patrick Ewing (born 1962), former professional and Basketball Hall of Fame player for the New York Knicks
 Tali Farhadian (born 1974/1975), former US federal prosecutor
 Jordan Farmar (born 1986), basketball player who has played for the New Jersey Nets
 Sadek Hilal (1930–2000), radiologist who was an influential researcher in advancing imaging science and radiology
 Roberta S. Jacobson (born 1960, née Steinfeld), U.S. diplomat who has served as Assistant Secretary of State for Western Hemisphere Affairs since March 2012
 Anjli Jain (born 1981), Executive Director of the CampusEAI Consortium
 Mario Jascalevich (1927–1984), physician tried and acquitted for the murder of five of his patients with curare, in a case often referred to as the "Dr X" killings
 Maude Sherwood Jewett (1873–1953), sculptor
 Rob Kaminsky (born 1994), MLB pitcher for the St. Louis Cardinals
 Christina McHale (born 1992), professional tennis player
 Alan Mruvka (born 1958), film producer and entrepreneur
 Anne Nichols (1891–1966), playwright who created Abie's Irish Rose
 Jill Oakes (born 1984), professional soccer player
 Rozanne Pollack (born 1948), contract bridge player
 Christopher Porrino (born 1967), lawyer who became Acting New Jersey Attorney General in June 2016
 Q-Tip (born 1970), hip-hop MC and producer
 Emily Remler (1957–1990), jazz guitarist in the 1980s
 Arnold Squitieri (1936–2022), underboss of the Gambino crime family
 Louis Teicher (1924–2008), piano player and half of the duo Ferrante & Teicher
 Trish Van Devere (born 1943), actress
 Rudy Van Gelder (1924–2016), jazz recording engineer
 Sarah Vaughan (1924–1990), jazz singer

See also
 List of U.S. cities with significant Korean-American populations
 Van Gelder Studio

Footnotes

Further reading

 Municipal Incorporations of the State of New Jersey (according to Counties) prepared by the Division of Local Government, Department of the Treasury (New Jersey); December 1, 1958.
 Clayton, W. Woodford; and Nelson, William. History of Bergen and Passaic Counties, New Jersey, with Biographical Sketches of Many of its Pioneers and Prominent Men. Philadelphia: Everts and Peck, 1882.
 Harvey, Cornelius Burnham (ed.), Genealogical History of Hudson and Bergen Counties, New Jersey. New York: New Jersey Genealogical Publishing Co., 1900.
 Jehn, Caye; and Jehn, Russ. The History of Englewood Cliffs, New Jersey, 1964–1994. Englewood Cliffs, NJ: Englewood Cliffs Centennial Committee, 1995.
 Van Valen, James M. History of Bergen County, New Jersey. New York: New Jersey Publishing and Engraving Co., 1900.
 Westervelt, Frances A. (Frances Augusta), 1858–1942, History of Bergen County, New Jersey, 1630–1923, Lewis Historical Publishing Company, 1923.

External links

 Englewood Cliffs official website

 
1895 establishments in New Jersey
Borough form of New Jersey government
Boroughs in Bergen County, New Jersey
Populated places established in 1895
New Jersey populated places on the Hudson River